Two ships of the United States Navy have been named Alazon Bay for Alazon Bay in Texas.

Sources
 

United States Navy ship names